Nesanoplium is a genus of beetles in the family Cerambycidae, containing the following species:

 Nesanoplium dalensi Chalumeau & Touroult, 2005
 Nesanoplium puberulum (Fleutiaux & Sallé, 1889)

References

Elaphidiini